Kiosk was a Scandinavian pay-per-view service available on Canal Digital's satellite platform and owned by Canal+. Kiosk showed feature films before they had their pay-TV premiere on Canal+. Kiosk ceased its operations on January 3, 2007.

Pan-Nordic television channels
Television channels and stations established in 1997
Television channels and stations disestablished in 2007
Defunct television channels in Sweden
Defunct television channels in Norway
Defunct television channels in Denmark
Defunct television channels in Finland